The Battle of Cañada was a popular insurrection against the American occupation of New Mexico by Mexicans and Pueblo Indians. It took place on January 24, 1847, during the Taos Revolt, a conflict of the Mexican–American War.

Background
Insurgents, Mexicans and Pueblo Indians in New Mexico under the leadership of Chavez, Montoya, Lafoya and Ortiz, assembled a large force at La Canada, intending to march onto the American-held city of Santa Fe. They would be intercepted by the American garrison of Santa Fe, resulting in the battle.

Colonel Sterling Price, commander of the U.S. forces in Santa Fe, heard of this insurgent movement on 20 Jan., having intercepted letters from the rebels, and assembled a force of 353 soldiers and militia to march north on 23 Jan., and intercept them. Price's force included Capt. McMillin's Company D, Capt. Williams' Company K, Capt. Lack's Company L, Capt. Halley's Company M, and Capt. Barber's Company N, 2d Regiment Missouri Mounted Volunteers, Capt. Agney's battalion of infantry and Capt. St. Vrain's Santa Fe volunteers, and Lt. A.B. Dyer's four mounted howitzers, while Lt. Col. Willock remained behind in command of the capital.

Battle
On 24 Jan., Price met the large insurgent force on the heights along the road to Santa Cruz de la Cañada and three strong houses at the base of the hill. Price placed his artillery on the left to fire on the houses and bluff, placed his dismounted men such that they were protected by the stream bluff, and sent Capt. St. Vrain to protect his wagon train a mile to the rear until it joined him. Price ordered Capt. Agney to dislodge the rebels occupying the house opposite his right flank, followed by a charge up the hill, supported by Lt. White and Capt. St. Vrain. Capt.s McMillen's, Barber's and Slack's men took possession of the houses enclosed by a strong corral. Price reported, "In a few minutes my troops had dislodged the enemy at all points, and they were flying in every direction."

Aftermath
Tafoya was killed, Chavez was later killed at Taos Pueblo, and Montoya was later caught and hanged at Don Fernando (today's Town of Taos, NM). Price camped on the field that night while the rebels retreated to Taos. On 29 Jan., Price met the insurgents at the Battle of Embudo Pass.

See also
 List of battles fought in New Mexico
 Battles of the Mexican–American War

References

Further reading
 Frazier, Donald S., editor The United States and Mexico at War (1998)
 Cooke, Philip St. George (1964). The Conquest of New Mexico and California, an Historical and Personal Narrative. Albuquerque, NM: Horn and Wallace. pp. 113–114.

Canada
History of Rio Arriba County, New Mexico
1847 in New Mexico Territory
January 1847 events
Canada